{{Infobox settlement
|name                   = Jales
|settlement_type        = Municipality
|nickname               = 
|motto                  =
|image_skyline          = 
|imagesize              = 
|image_caption          = 
|image_flag             = Jales_Bandeira.gif
|image_seal             = Jales_Brasao.gif
|image_map              = SaoPaulo Municip Jales.svg
|mapsize                = 250px
|map_caption            = Location of Jales
|pushpin_map            =Brazil
|subdivision_type   = Country
|subdivision_type1  = Region
|subdivision_type2  = State
|subdivision_type3  = Mesoregion
|subdivision_name   = 
|subdivision_name1  = Southeast
|subdivision_name2  = 
|subdivision_name3  = São José do Rio Preto
|leader_title           = Mayor
|leader_name            = Flavio Prandi Franco (DEM)
|established_title      =
|established_date       = 2013
|area_total_km2         = 368.5
|area_total_sq_mi       =
|area_urban_km2         = 
|area_urban_sq_mi       =
|population_as_of       = 2020 
|population_note        =
|population_total       = 49,201
|population_density_km2 = 127.57
|population_density_sq_mi = 
|population_urban       =  
|timezone               = UTC-3
|utc_offset             = -3
|timezone_DST           = UTC-2
|utc_offset_DST         = -2
|coordinates            = 
|elevation_m            = 478
|elevation_ft           = 
|area_code              = +55 17
|postal_code_type       = Postal Code
|postal_code            = 15700-000
|website                = Prefecture of Jales, São Paulo
|blank_name             = HDI'' (UNDP/2000)
|blank_info             = 0.804 – high
|footnotes              =
}}Jales''' is a municipality in the state of São Paulo, Brazil. The population in 2020, according to the IBGE, is 49,201 inhabitants. The city is located 601 km from the city of São Paulo.

It is the seat of the Roman Catholic Diocese of Jales.

History

The city was founded on April 15, 1941.

Demographics

Statistics
Area: 368.5 km²
Population density: 127.57/km² (IBGE/2010) - 222.90/km² (SEADE/2011)
Urbanization: 94.1% (2010)
Sex ratio (Males to Females): 95.4 (2011)
Birth rate: 10.77/1,000 inhab. (2009)
Infant mortality: 15.8/1,000 births (2009)
Homicide rate: 4.0/100 thousand ppl (2008)
HDI: 0.804 (UNDP/2000)

All statistics are from SEADE and IBGE.

Economy

The Tertiary sector corresponds to 72.6% of the Jales GDP. Industry has a participation of 23,51%, and the Primary sector corresponds to 3.89% of the GDP.

Notable people
 Régis Augusto Salmazzo Football player

References